Parzania (translation: Heaven and hell on earth) is a 2007 Indian drama film co-written and directed by Rahul Dholakia; David N. Donihue is the other co-writer. The film featured Naseeruddin Shah and Sarika in the lead roles, while Corin Nemec and Raj Zutshi played supporting roles. Made on a budget of US$700,000, the film was shot in Ahmedabad and Hyderabad.

The film is inspired by the true story of a ten-year-old Parsi boy, Azhar Mody (represented in the film as the character Parzaan Pithawala) who disappeared after the 28 February 2002 Gulbarg Society massacre during which 69 people were killed and which was one of many events in the communal riots in Gujarat in 2002. The film traces the journey of the Pithawala family while trying to locate their missing son.

The film was premiered at 36th India International Film Festival in Goa on 26 November 2005, before being released nationwide on 26 January 2007.

Plot
Allan (Corin Nemec), an American, arrives in Ahmedabad searching for answers, to find internal peace and to understand the world and his troubled life. He chooses India as his school and Gandhi as the subject of his thesis. It is here that he meets the Pithawala family — Cyrus (Naseeruddin Shah), his wife Shernaz (Sarika), son Parzan (Parzan Dastur) and daughter Dilshad (Pearl Barsiwala). The Pithawalas being Parsis follow Zoroastrianism. Through them and the teachings of a Gandhian, Allan starts to find peace of mind.

The plot is based on the story of Rupa Mody, whose son went missing after the 2002 Gujarat riots. The ten-year-old Parzan disappears during these riots when their surrounding homes are attacked. Cyrus, Shernaz and Dilshad manage to escape the carnage. In the aftermath of the riots, Cyrus searches for his missing child while fighting for his own sanity. While assisting the Pithawalas in their search, Allan battles to uncover the reason behind the riots in an effort to make some sense of the incident. People start to question government's official explanation of the incident which downplays any conspiracy. As a result, a Human Rights Commission is formed. Through the commission, several witnesses and victims testify against the indifference of the police to protect them from the rioters. The film ends with a dedication to the victims of communal violence.

Cast

 Naseeruddin Shah as Cyrus
 Corin Nemec as Allan
 Sarika as Shernaz
 Parzan Dastur as Parzan
 Pearl Barsiwalla
 Raj Zutshi
 Asif Basra
 Pushpendra Saini
 Ram Gopal Bajaj

Production
In the 2002 communal riots in Gujarat, Los Angeles-based director Rahul Dholakia faced a personal tragedy. The riots left his friend's family shattered and this left an indelible mark on him. It hurt him all the more because the incidents happened in his home state. He felt responsible, both morally and socially, and wanted to speak up as a filmmaker. Most of the US$700,000 budget came from two of his Indian friends in the United States. Dholakia chose to make the film in English because he thought that communal riots was a global issue. Furthermore, he was unsure whether he could have the film released in India, given the sensitive nature of the film.

While deciding on the cast, Dholakia said that they were not looking at people's physical appearances. He added:
We didn't want glamorous people to play realistic roles. We've shot the film without any makeup, etc. We needed people who looked believable. So casting did play a major role, and I'm not even talking about the principal cast. Every actor in the film has been auditioned, and that includes people with one line to say or not even that.

Veteran actor Naseeruddin Shah was the first and obvious choice for the film. But Dholakia was very apprehensive about whether Shah would agree to do the film, and if he could pay his remuneration. His latter worry was because the film started out as a very low-budget film. After Dholakia narrated the script to him, Shah said, "I agree in principle, provided we make this sensitively and sensibly." Shah thought that the film's story needed to be told, and he felt that he had to be part of it. After agreeing to join the cast, Shah did not actively research for his character. Being a parent himself, he felt that it was not difficult for him to empathize with the family whose son was lost in the riots. After 18 years of hiatus, Sarika chose to return to cinema with this film. Since the film dealt with a real and sensitive issue, she felt that Parzania went beyond than being just a film. Despite facing the camera after a long gap, Sarika felt quite comfortable during the shooting.

Shortly thereafter, Shah, Sarika and Dholakia went through the script in great detail. Owing to their screen and real-life experiences, Shah and Sarika suggested changes and revised the script several times.

Because the film was about communal riots in Gujarat, the film was purposefully not released there, as the cinema owners refused to screen it, fearing backlash. After an initiative by ANHAD, a civil rights group, the film was screened at some places in the state after April 2007.

Awards and honours

References

External links
 
 

2005 films
2005 drama films
Indian films based on actual events
English-language Indian films
Indian drama films
Films set in India
Films set in Ahmedabad
Films featuring a Best Actress National Award-winning performance
Films about religious violence in India
Films whose director won the Best Director National Film Award
Films shot in Gujarat
Films directed by Rahul Dholakia
2002 Gujarat riots
2000s English-language films